Edward "Teddy" Haines (birth unknown – death unknown) was an English professional rugby league footballer who played in the 1920s and 1930s He played at representative level for England, and at club level for Salford, as a , i.e. number 11 or 12, during the era of contested scrums.

International honours
Teddy Haines won a cap for England while at Salford in 1927 against Wales.

References

England national rugby league team players
English rugby league players
Place of birth missing
Place of death missing
Rugby league second-rows
Salford Red Devils players
Year of birth missing
Year of death missing